The 2004 Hopman Cup (also known as the Hyundai Hopman Cup for sponsorship reasons) was the 16th Hopman Cup tennis tournament held at the Burswood Entertainment Complex in Perth from 3 through 10 January 2004. Slovakia's Daniela Hantuchová and Karol Kučera made the final, but lost to Americans Lindsay Davenport and James Blake.

Play-off

Hungary vs. Canada

Group A

Teams and standings
 – Barbora Strýcová and Jiří Novák (Round robin win–loss: 0–3; match win–loss: 2–7; final position: 4)
 – Amélie Mauresmo and Fabrice Santoro (Round robin win–loss: 2–1; match win–loss: 4–5; final position: 2)
 – Anastasia Myskina and Marat Safin (Round robin win–loss: 1–2; match win–loss: 3–6; final position: 3)
 – Lindsay Davenport and James Blake (Round robin win–loss: 3–0; match win–loss: 9–0; final position: 1)

France vs. Czech Republic

France vs. Russia

Russia vs. Czech Republic

United States vs. Czech Republic

United States vs. France

United States vs. Russia

Group B

Teams and standings
1 – Alicia Molik and Lleyton Hewitt (Round robin win–loss: 2–1; match win–loss: 7–2; final position: 1)
 – Kim Clijsters and Xavier Malisse (Round robin win–loss: 1–1; match win–loss: 3–3; final position: 4)
2 – Maureen Drake and Frank Dancevic (Round robin win–loss: 0–2; match win–loss: 1–5; final position: Not ranked)
 – Petra Mandula and Attila Sávolt (Round robin win–loss: 1–2; match win–loss: 6–6; final position: 3)
 – Daniela Hantuchová and Karol Kučera (Round robin win–loss: 2–1; match win–loss: 4–5; final position: 2)

1Due to an injury to Alicia Molik, Australia was unable to compete in the final. Slovakia competed in the final in their place.
2Canada lost in qualifying to Hungary, but then took the place of Belgium in the Hungary-Belgium tie.

Australia vs. Belgium

Australia vs. Hungary

Belgium vs. Slovakia

Hungary vs. Canada

Slovakia vs. Australia

Slovakia vs. Hungary

Final

United States vs. Slovakia

External links

2004
Hopman Cup
January 2004 sports events in Australia